Malnesberget (Mount Malnes) is a  mountain in the municipality of Bø in Nordland county, Norway. The mountain stands on the western side of the large island of Langøya, along the Malnesfjorden, just south of the villages of Hovden and Malnes (hence the name).

References

Hills of Norway
Mountains of Nordland
Bø, Nordland
Mountains under 1000 metres